Steven Ferencz Udvar–Házy (born 1946), also known as István or Steve Hazy, is an American billionaire businessman and the executive chairman of Air Lease Corporation. He is the former chairman and CEO of International Lease Finance Corporation (ILFC), one of the two largest aircraft lessors in the world (the other being AerCap.) Forbes magazine's 2021 list of The World's Billionaires estimated his net worth at US$4 billion.

Early life
The Udvar-Házy family moved to the US in 1958, fleeing the Soviet occupation of Hungary. Hazy attended University High School in Los Angeles, and the University of California, Los Angeles.

Career
Udvar-Házy was in his 20s during the later part of transition from propeller aircraft to jets during the mid to late 1960s, and realized that the higher capital investment required to purchase jet aircraft created an opportunity for a leasing business. He founded ILFC with fellow Hungarian Leslie Gonda and his son Louis Gonda in 1973, leasing a single used Douglas DC-8 to Aeroméxico. He left ILFC in February 2010 and founded Air Lease Corporation.

In 2016, Prime Minister of Hungary Viktor Orbán presented Udvar-Házy the Grand Cross of the Order of Merit of Hungary for his achievements in airline industry.

Philanthropy
Udvar-Házy gave a US$66 million grant to the Smithsonian Institution that allowed the U.S. National Air and Space Museum to build the Steven F. Udvar-Hazy Center annex at Washington Dulles International Airport. The annex houses more than 120 aircraft and 140 space-exploration exhibits as of 2006, and also includes the Space Shuttle Discovery. Plans call for eventually installing over 300 aircraft.

The Udvar-Házy family contributed funds to build the Christine and Steven F. Udvar-Hazy Library and Learning Center at Embry–Riddle Aeronautical University's Prescott Campus. The business building at Utah Tech University in St. George, Utah is named after his parents, Erno and Etel Udvar-Házy.

Personal life
He is married with four children, and lives in Beverly Hills, California.

See also
The World's Billionaires

References

1946 births
Living people
American airline chief executives
American billionaires
American philanthropists
Hungarian emigrants to the United States
Businesspeople from Los Angeles
University of California, Los Angeles alumni
Hungarian billionaires
People from Budapest

Further reading